Youssouf Nyange Ndayishimiye (born 27 October 1998) is a Burundian professional footballer who plays as a midfielder or central defender for Ligue 1 club Nice and the Burundi national team.

Club career
In January 2023 Ndayishimiye joined Ligue 1 club Nice from Süper Lig side İstanbul Başakşehir. He signed a contract until 2027 while, according to Turkish media, Nice agreed a transfer fee of €11 million plus bonuses with İstanbul Başakşehir.

International career
Ndayishimiye represented the Burundi national team in a 7–0 friendly win over Djibouti on 11 March 2017.

Career statistics

Club

International

References

External links
 
 

1998 births
Living people
Burundian footballers
Burundi international footballers
Association football midfielders
Süper Lig players
Yeni Malatyaspor footballers
İstanbul Başakşehir F.K. players
OGC Nice players
Burundian expatriate footballers
Burundian expatriate sportspeople in Turkey
Expatriate footballers in Turkey
Burundian expatriate sportspeople in France
Expatriate footballers in France